Benoît Jacques Joseph Gratton (born December 28, 1976) is a Canadian former professional ice hockey forward who played in the National Hockey League (NHL). He is currently the head coach for Jonquière Marquis of the Ligue Nord-Américaine de Hockey (LNAH).

Playing career

Gratton was born in Montreal, Quebec. As a youth, he played in the 1989 and 1990 Quebec International Pee-Wee Hockey Tournaments with a minor ice hockey team from Montreal.

Selected 105th overall by the Washington Capitals in the 1995 NHL Entry Draft, Gratton spent several seasons in the Capitals' system before he was traded to the Calgary Flames in 1999.  After spending several seasons in the Flames' organization, he was claimed on waivers in 2001 by the Montreal Canadiens.

From 2004 to 2014, Gratton played hockey in Europe, most notably playing six seasons with the Vienna Capitals.

After sitting out the 2014–15 season, Gratton made a semi-professional return in the Quebec-based Ligue Nord-Américaine de Hockey (LNAH) with Jonquière Marquis, playing two seasons until announcing his retirement following the 2016–17 season.

Coaching career
Prior to the 2017–18 season, Gratton continued his association with Jonquière Marquis as he was appointed head coach of the club on August 18, 2017.

Career statistics

Awards and honours

References

External links

1976 births
Living people
Calgary Flames players
Canadian ice hockey centres
French Quebecers
Granby Prédateurs players
Hamburg Freezers players
Hamilton Bulldogs (AHL) players
HC Lugano players
Ice hockey people from Montreal
Laval Titan players
Laval Titan Collège Français players
Montreal Canadiens players
Portland Pirates players
Quebec Citadelles players
Saint John Flames players
Vienna Capitals players
Washington Capitals draft picks
Washington Capitals players
Canadian expatriate ice hockey players in Austria
Canadian expatriate ice hockey players in Germany
Canadian expatriate ice hockey players in Switzerland